Gaimberg is a municipality in the district of Lienz in the Austrian state of Tyrol. It is situated north of the town of Lienz. The neighbouring municipalities are Lienz, Nußdorf-Debant, and Thurn. The municipality consists of the following neighbourhoods: Grafendorf, Obergaimberg, Untergaimberg, Kranzhofsiedlung and Wartschensiedlung.

Population

References

Cities and towns in Lienz District